Terminator Genisys: Future War is a mobile MMO strategy video game created by Plarium in cooperation with Skydance Media. The events of the game take place in the post-apocalyptic universe of the Terminator Genisys film. The game was announced on June 28, 2016 and released on May 18, 2017 on the iOS App Store and Google Play. It uses Plarium's usual model of free to play, with some in-game features and upgrades available to purchase.

Gameplay 
 
In Terminator Genisys: Future War, players construct buildings, improve their base, train their troops, upgrade their leader, and create and develop clans. In total, 48 unit types are available to the player (24 for each faction). They are divided into six classes: infantry, cavalry, aviation, spy drones, assault and siege troops.

In-game processes are initiated by using the following resources: energy, iridium, materials, ammo, fuel and the special in-game currency, technology points. These technology points can also be used to speed up an active process. To obtain resources, players need to construct special buildings or send their units to resource locations. As the game progresses, the cost and length of in-game processes increase accordingly.

The strategic aim for players in a clan is to capture the time machine, a special location at the center of each dimension.

Storyline 
Terminator Genisys: Future War is set directly after the events of the film Terminator Genisys. Genisys is destroyed and Skynet is offline, but the future war is far from over. 

The game gives players two options: they can lead the Resistance or join Skynet’s mechanized forces. According to the game's developers, "In a first for any Terminator game, players will have the option to be a Resistance or Skynet Commander as they battle rival player alliances for territory, dominance and survival."

Arnold Schwarzenegger 
In the game, players can choose Arnold Schwarzenegger, the T-800 android, as the leader of their army. The character also guides players in the tutorial.

Reception

References

External links 
 

2017 video games
Android (operating system) games
IOS games
Browser games
Online games
Mobile games
Free-to-play video games
Massively multiplayer online real-time strategy games
Terminator (franchise) video games
Video games developed in Israel
Plarium games